Barbora Hrzánová (born 22 April 1964) is a Czech actress and musician. She won the Alfréd Radok Award for Best Actress in 1994 for her role in the play The Seagull at the Theatre on the Balustrade in Prague. At the 2003 Thalia Awards, she won Best Actress in a Play for her role in Hrdý Budžes at the Antonín Dvořák Theatre in Příbram. She is married to actor Radek Holub, with whom she often performs on stage.

Career

Acting
After graduating from Prague's DAMU, Hrzánová joined the National Theater. In 1993, she moved to the Theatre on the Balustrade.

Her first prominent film role was in Filip Renč's 1992 production Requiem pro panenku, for which she was awarded at the Toronto International Film Festival. In 1994, she won the Alfréd Radok Award for Best Actress in Chekhov's play The Seagull. Following this, she spent ten years at Divadlo v Řeznické in Prague, also appearing at Divadlo Na Jezerce.

She has been nominated for a Czech Lion Award three times: for Best Supporting Actress in Thanks for Every New Morning (1994), Conspirators of Pleasure (1996), and Modrý tygr (2012). She won a Thalia Award in 2003 for her performance in the production Hrdý Budžes.

Other projects
The actress is a member of the band Bára Hrzánová & Condurango, which she formed in the 1980s with fellow DAMU alumnus Pavel Anděl. She is the band's primary songwriter, as well as singing and playing percussion and the trumpet. She has also coauthored the book Vinnetou naší doby: Velký tajem staré lišky Báry Hrzánové, together with magazine editor Richard Erml.

Personal life
Hrzánová is married to Radek Holub. She is the daughter of actor Jiří Hrzán, and her brother-in-law is Karel Dobrý. Her nephew is actor and model Cyril Dobrý.

Selected filmography

Film

Television

References

External links
 

1964 births
Living people
Actors from České Budějovice
Czech television actresses
Czech stage actresses
Czech film actresses
20th-century Czech actresses
21st-century Czech actresses
Czech women singers
Recipients of the Thalia Award